Özgür Yılmaz (born 7 March 1986) is a Turkish professional footballer who plays as a defender for Kastamonuspor.

Professional career
Beginning his career as an amateur footballer, Özgür worked his way up becoming a stalwart at Gaziosmanpaşaspor, and then became captain of Giresunspor in the second division of Turkey. Özgür signed his first professional contract with Kardemir Karabükspor on 31 January 2018, for 1.5 years. Özgür made his professional debut with Kardemir Karabükspor in a 3-1 Süper Lig loss to Yeni Malatyaspor on 25 February 2018, at the age of 30.

References

External links
 
 
 

1986 births
Living people
People from Üsküdar
Footballers from Istanbul
Turkish footballers
Kardemir Karabükspor footballers
Gaziosmanpaşaspor footballers
Alibeyköyspor footballers
Giresunspor footballers
Kastamonuspor footballers
TFF First League players
TFF Second League players
Association football defenders